Nobody's Watching/Nobody's Listening is a combination CD/DVD, released by the Pernice Brothers in 2005. It consists of material recorded on the Pernice Brothers' 2004 tour, including a cover of a song by frontman Joe Pernice's former band, the Scud Mountain Boys, as well as a Pretenders cover.

The DVD includes the videos for "Baby in Two" and "Weakest Shade of Blue" (two cuts from previous album Yours, Mine and Ours), as well as a tour diary.

Track listing

DVD contents
"Nobody's Watching" (tour diary)
"Baby in Two" (video)
"Baby in Two" (storyboard)
"Weakest Shade of Blue" (video)
"Weakest Shade of Blue" (storyboard)

Pernice Brothers albums
2005 live albums
2005 video albums